Antanas Merkys (1 February 1887 – 5 March 1955) was the last Prime Minister of independent Lithuania, serving from November 1939 to June 1940. When the Soviet Union presented an ultimatum to Lithuania demanding that it accept a Soviet garrison, President Antanas Smetona fled the country leaving Merkys as acting president. Merkys ostensibly cooperated with the Soviets, and illegally took over the presidency in his own right. After three days, Merkys handed power to Justas Paleckis, who formed the People's Government of Lithuania. When Merkys attempted to flee the country, he was captured and deported to the interior of Russia, where he died in 1955.

Biography

Merkys was born at Bajorai, near Skapiškis. Educated in law, he served in the Russian Army during World War I (1914–18). In 1919, he served as the newly independent Lithuania's Minister of Defence before serving with the Lithuanian Army until his decommissioning in 1922. He then practised as a lawyer.

After the Klaipėda Revolt of 1923, Merkys became secretary to the Klaipėda Region Commissioner, Antanas Smetona. Following the 1926 Lithuanian coup d'état, he became Minister of Defence again until 1927, when he was made Governor of Klaipėda Region. In 1932, German demands prompted his removal as Governor and Merkys returned to practising law. He became Mayor of Kaunas in 1933 and served in this position until 1939. In 1936 was elected to the Fourth Seimas of Lithuania. On 17 November 1939 he became Prime Minister.

Soviet ultimatum and occupation
When, on 14 June 1940, the Soviet Union presented an ultimatum to Lithuania, Smetona proposed armed resistance. Merkys suggested accepting the ultimatum and offered to resign as Prime Minister, but he temporarily remained in office. Merkys agreed to Soviet demands that Smetona be arrested, but was unsuccessful in doing so. Rather than accept the demands, Smetona fled to Germany and then to Switzerland. Before leaving the country, he symbolically turned over his presidential duties to Merkys. Under the Constitution of 1938, the prime minister served as acting president whenever the president was unable to carry out his duties.

The day after Smetona's departure, Merkys announced on national radio that he had removed Smetona and was now president in his own right. The following morning, the cabinet resolved that Smetona had effectively resigned by leaving the country, and confirmed Merkys as president. On 17 June 1940 Merkys acceded to more Soviet demands—a) dispatch police to arrest Skučas and Povilaitis near the Lithuanian border and b) appointing Justas Paleckis as the new Prime Minister. Merkys resigned later that day, making Paleckis acting president as well. The Soviets then used Paleckis as a puppet to provide the ostensibly legal sanction for its annexation of Lithuania a month later.

Since Lithuania regained independence from the Soviet Union, it has maintained that Merkys' takeover of the presidency was illegal and unconstitutional, since Smetona never formally resigned. For that reason, Merkys is not recognized as a legitimate president in Lithuanian government records. When Lithuania declared independence from the Soviet Union in 1990, it took the line that since Merkys' seizure of the presidency was illegal, all actions leading up to Lithuania's annexation by the Soviet Union later that year were ipso facto void. Therefore, Lithuania contended that it did not need to follow the secession process outlined in the Soviet Constitution, since it was reasserting an independence that still existed under international law.

A month later Merkys attempted to escape to Sweden, but was arrested in Riga. He and his family were deported to Saratov in Russia. In 1941 Merkys was imprisoned. In 1954, during the period of de-Stalinization, Merkys was released from prison, but not allowed to return to Lithuania. He lived in Vladimir until his death the following year, on 5 March 1955. Subsequently, his grave could not be located, but a symbolic cenotaph dedicated to Merkys' memory is in the Petrašiūnai Cemetery in Kaunas.

Awards 

  Order of the Cross of Vytis, Knight (5th Class, 1927)
  Order of the Lithuanian Grand Duke Gediminas, Grand Cross (1938) and Commander's Grand Cross (1928)
  Order of the Three Stars, 1st Class (15 March 1937)

See also
 Prime Minister of Lithuania
 List of rulers of Lithuania

References

1880s births
1955 deaths
Inmates of Vladimir Central Prison
Lithuanian jurists
Lithuanian people of World War II
Ministers of Defence of Lithuania
People from Panevėžys County
Presidents of Lithuania
Prime Ministers of Lithuania
Prisoners and detainees of the Soviet Union
Taras Shevchenko National University of Kyiv alumni
World War II political leaders
Recipients of the Order of the Lithuanian Grand Duke Gediminas
Recipients of the Order of the Cross of Vytis
Members of the Seimas